Svetlana Sourtseva (Светлана Сергеевна Сурцева) (born Svetlana Sergueïevna Akulova 10 April 1984 in Cheliabinsk) is a Russian volleyball player.

She played for the Russia women's national volleyball team.
She participated in the 2007 Women's European Volleyball Championship, and the 2007 FIVB World Grand Prix.

Clubs

References

External links 

1984 births
Living people
Russian women's volleyball players
Universiade bronze medalists for Russia
Universiade medalists in volleyball
Medalists at the 2011 Summer Universiade
20th-century Russian women
21st-century Russian women